Herbers is a surname. Notable people with the surname include:

Fabian Herbers (born 1993), German footballer
Ian Herbers (born 1967), Canadian ice hockey player and coach
John Herbers (1923–2017), American journalist, author, editor, and veteran
Katja Herbers (born 1980), Dutch actress

See also
Herber
Herbés